Astra 2F is one of the Astra communications satellites owned and operated by SES S.A., launched in September 2012 to the Astra 28.2°E orbital position. The satellite provides free-to-air and encrypted direct-to-home (DTH) digital television and satellite broadband services for Europe and Africa.

Astra 2F is the first of three "second generation" satellites for the 28.2° East position which replace the first generation Astra 2A, Astra 2B and Astra 2D satellite previously there. The second, Astra 2E, was launched in 2013, and the third, Astra 2G, was launched in 2014, (launched on 27 December 2014,). Some parts of the construction of Astra 2F by Astrium (now Airbus Defence and Space) in Stevenage, United Kingdom could be seen in the BBC2 documentary programme, How To Build... A Satellite broadcast on 27 November 2011.

Astra 2F was successfully launched from Kourou in French Guiana on 28 September 2012, at 21:18:07 UTC by an Ariane 5ECA launch vehicle from Centre Spatial Guyanais. and underwent in-orbit testing at 43.5° East. Commercial operations at 28.2° East began on 21 November 2012.

Market 
The Astra 28.2° East orbital position was established in 1998 to provide digital television, digital radio and multimedia services to the United Kingdom and Ireland, and Astra 2F's primary mission is to continue this provision as replacement and follow-on capacity to the Astra 2A, Astra 2B, Astra 2D and Astra 1N satellites, delivering programming to almost 13 million satellite homes, over 3 million cable homes, and 700,000 Internet Protocol television (IPTV) homes in the United Kingdom and Ireland, in particular for channels from the major UK digital satellite television satellite bus, BSkyB and Freesat.

In addition, Astra 2F serves the growing direct-to-home (DTH) platforms in West Africa such as Multi TV of Ghana.

Astra 2F is also designed to provide SES Broadband’s first commercial Ka-band satellite broadband service in Europe, with a Ka-band payload delivering high-speed Internet access (at download speeds up to 20 Mbit/s) along with Voice over Internet Protocol (VoIP), and Internet Protocol television (IPTV) from November 2012.

Broadcasting footprint 
Astra 2F has three Ku-band downlink beams covering Europe and Africa. The Europe Beam is centred on the English Channel with maximum signal (for reception on a 40 cm dish) over the United Kingdom, Ireland, France, Benelux, and parts of Germany, Austria, and Spain (including a "lobe" specifically designed to serve the Canary Islands which officially requires a 120 cm dish but in practise is easily receivable using a 90 cm dish as with Astra 2E), and reception on a 1 m dish extending to North Africa, Poland and the Balkans.

The UK Beam provides maximum signal (40 cm dishes) over the United Kingdom, Ireland, Benelux and Northern France in close approximation of the UK Beam of Astra 2D, which it replaces. Due to the tight footprint, some reception issues for UK channels are being reported in Spain as of December 2012. Early reports of test transmissions on 11.023 GHz H 23000 DVB-S2 suggest the beam is very tight with a very sharp fall off to the west and east of the footprint, but eastern Spain seems to be getting a higher signal strength possibly due to the off-axis beam as 28.2° East on the geostationary arc is not directly in line with the United Kingdom but offset to the east.

The West Africa beam provides for reception with 60 cm dishes across southern West Africa from Senegal to Nigeria, with a lower signal level (80 cm dishes) extending across the Democratic Republic of the Congo.
 
The Ka-band footprint for satellite broadband provides full service coverage across western Europe from the United Kingdom and France in the west to the Czech Republic, Austria, Croatia and Bosnia and Herzegovina in the east.

Active transponders 
Below is a list of the TV channels broadcast to Europe from active transponders on Astra 2F :

See also 

 2012 in spaceflight
 SES satellite operator
 Astra satellite family
 Astra 28.2°E orbital position
 Astra 2E co-located satellite
 Astra 2G co-located satellite

References

External links 
 SES fleet information and map
 Official SES site

Astra satellites
2012 in Luxembourg
Satellites of Luxembourg
Spacecraft launched in 2012
Communications satellites in geostationary orbit
Ariane commercial payloads
Satellites using the Eurostar bus